Most of Bob Marley's early music was recorded with Peter Tosh and Bunny Wailer, who together with Marley were the most prominent members of the Wailers. In 1972, the Wailers had their first hit outside Jamaica when Johnny Nash covered their song "Stir It Up", which became a UK hit. The 1973 album Catch a Fire was released worldwide, and sold well. It was followed by Burnin', which included the song "I Shot the Sheriff". Eric Clapton's cover of the song became a hit in 1974.

Peter Tosh and Bunny Wailer left the Wailers in 1974. Bob Marley proceeded with Bob Marley and the Wailers, which included the Wailers Band and the I Threes. In 1975, he had his first own hit outside Jamaica with "No Woman, No Cry", from the Live! album. His subsequent albums, including Rastaman Vibration, Exodus, Kaya, Survival and the last album released during his lifetime, Uprising, were big international sellers. Between 1991 and 2007 Bob Marley and the Wailers sold in excess of 21 million records. These statistics did not begin to be collected until ten years after his death.

The Roots Reggae Library has created an overview of the music released by the Wailers prior to their contract with the Island Records label. This overview lists all the Wailers' songs known to have been released during that period, filled into six ska albums and 11 rocksteady albums.

Albums

Studio albums

Live albums

Compilation albums

Trojan releases

Island/Tuff Gong releases

Remix albums

Island/Tuff Gong releases

Box sets

Island/Tuff Gong releases
 The Box Set (1982)
 Songs of Freedom (1992)

JAD/Trojan releases
 The Early Years (1993)
 The Complete Bob Marley & the Wailers 1967–1972, Part I (1997)
 The Complete Bob Marley & the Wailers 1967–1972, Part II (1997)
 The Complete Bob Marley & the Wailers 1967–1972, Part III (1998)
 The Complete Upsetter Collection (2000)
 REBEL: The Finest of The Complete Bob Marley & the Wailers 1967–1972 (2002)
 The Upsetter Singles Box (2002)
 Grooving Kingston 12 (2004)
 Fy-ah, Fy-ah (2004)
 Man to Man (2005)

Other albums

Singles

1960s

1970s

1980s

1990s

2000s

2010s

Videos

Video albums
 Live at The Rainbow (1978)
 The Bob Marley Story: Caribbean Nights (1982)

Music videos

Notes

References

Sources

External links
 
 
 
 

Reggae discographies
Discographies of Jamaican artists
Discography
Bob Marley